Carcinops viridicollis is a species of clown beetle in the family Histeridae.  It is found in Central America and North America.

References

Further reading

 
 
 

Histeridae
Beetles described in 1855